Oreste Scalzone (born 26 January 1947) is an Italian Marxist intellectual and one of the founders of the communist organization Potere Operaio.

Scalzone was born in Terni, Umbria. In 1968 he came to know Franco Piperno, and on 1 March that year he took part in the clashes against Italian police at Valle Giulia. A few days later his vertebral column was seriously injured by a desk thrown from a window by neofascist students, mostly belonging to the Italian Social Movement, that were occupying the faculty of Law of the University La Sapienza in Rome. About the 1968 movement, he said:

With Piperno and Toni Negri, he founded Potere Operaio in 1969. On 7 April 1979, he was arrested, along with Negri, Piperno and others members of the autonomist movement, and accused of planning armed attacks and plotting to overthrow the government. In 1981 he managed to flee first to Denmark, then to Paris, where he remained protected from extradition thanks to the Mitterrand doctrine. Scalzone revealed that his escape was helped by actor and friend Gian Maria Volonté. In 1983 he was sentenced to 16 years' jail, reduced to nine in 1989. While in France, Scalzone worked for a political solution to the "Years of Lead" that could lead to an amnesty to political refugees and prisoners.

In 1998 he briefly and secretly came back to Italy passing through Corsica: a photographic service by the newsmagazine L'Espresso later revealed the episode.

In 2002 he went on hunger strike in protest against the extradition of Paolo Persichetti.

A 17 January 2007 ruling of the Court of Milan declared his crimes ("subversive association and member of an armed organization") prescribed. He announced he had come back to Italy to "fight, under new conditions, an old battle".

See also
Autonomist movement
Battle of Valle Giulia
Primavalle Fire

References

External links
 Oreste Scalzone blog 

1947 births
Living people
People from Terni
Italian communists
Autonomism
Potere Operaio
Libertarian socialists